The giant slalom is conducted in two runs, with emphasis on manoeuvering rather than speed as the gates are fairly close together – but not as close as in slalom. The giant slalom also promotes endurance, with the primary difference between it and the slalom competition being the length of the course - the difference in level in giant slalom is 300 to 450 metres, while in slalom it is between 180 and 220 metres. This also leads to the gates being further apart in giant slalom. The men's giant slalom took place on 20 February.

Stephan Eberharter won the 2002 giant slalom gold, but he had since retired . The 2005 World Champion, Hermann Maier had skied ahead of the Olympics, however, and was fourth in the Giant Slalom World Cup - which was headed by Maier's compatriot Benjamin Raich.

Results
Complete results from the men's giant slalom event at the 2006 Winter Olympics.

References

External links
Official Olympic Report

Giant slalom